Carnkie is the name of two places in Cornwall, UK:

 Carnkie, Helston
 Carnkie, Redruth